Arles or Arless (historically Ardlisse, from ) is a village in County Laois, Ireland.

Located close to Carlow, the village has expanded in size since its foundation, when it comprised just a few houses around the church. The church was built in the 1680s (according to an inscription on a stone in the wall) and originally had a thatched roof. A mausoleum to the Grace family was built in the churchyard in 1818.

Public transport
On weekdays, the village is served by JJ Kavanagh and Sons Abbeyleix/Portlaoise-Athy-Carlow bus route with two daily journeys each way. Bus Éireann route 73 from Waterford to Athlone passes through the village but does not stop there. Carlow railway station is the nearest train station.

References

See also
 List of towns and villages in Ireland

Towns and villages in County Laois
Townlands of County Laois